A/S Westermoen Båtbyggeri og Mek Verksted was a shipyard located in Mandal, Norway, who specialized in high speed craft. Under the leadership of Toralf Westermoen in the 1950s, the yard has produced a long range of high speed boat types, such as:

 The Tjeld-class patrol boat, from 1957
 The Storm-class patrol boat, from 1963

Jan Herman Linge, later famous as designer of many sailboats and other recreational vessel, served as head engineer from 1949 to 1956, and was responsible for the design of the Tjeld class.

See also
 Westamarin
 Kværner Båtservice

Defunct companies of Norway
Shipbuilding companies of Norway
Shipyards of Norway